Vadodara, also known as Baroda, is the  second city in the Indian state of Gujarat. It serves as the administrative headquarters of the Vadodara district and is situated on the banks of the Vishwamitri River,  from the state capital of Gandhinagar. The railway line and National Highway 8, which connect Delhi with Mumbai, pass through Vadodara. The city is named for its abundance of the Banyan (Vad) tree. Vadodara is also locally referred to as the Sanskari Nagari and Kala Nagari of India.

The city is prominent for landmarks such as the Laxmi Vilas Palace, which served as the residence of the Maratha royal Gaekwad dynasty that ruled over Baroda State. It is also the home of the Maharaja Sayajirao University of Baroda.

Etymology

The city in one period was called Chandanavati after the rule of Chanda of the Dodiya Rajputs. The capital was also known as Virakshetra or Viravati (Land of Warriors). Later on, it was known as Vadpatraka or Vadodará, and according to tradition, is a corrupt form of the Sanskrit word vatodar, meaning "in the belly of the Banyan tree". It is, as of 2000, almost impossible to ascertain when the various changes in the name were made; early English travellers and merchants of the 18th century mention the town as Baroda, and it is from this, that the name Baroda is derived; in 1974 (well after independence) the official name of the city was changed to Vadodara.

Geography
The city sits on the banks of the Vishwamitri River, in central Gujarat. The Vishwamitri frequently dries up in the summer, leaving only a small stream of water. The city is located on the fertile plain between the Mahi and Narmada Rivers. According to the Bureau of Indian Standards, the cosmopolis falls under seismic zone-III, on a scale of I to V (in order of increasing proneness to earthquakes).

Climate

There are three main seasons: summer, monsoon and winter. Aside from the monsoon season, the climate is dry. Cold northerly winds are responsible for mildly chilly days in January. The southwest monsoon brings a humid climate from mid-June to mid-September.

Demographics

At the time of the 2011 census of India, Vadodara Municipal Corporation and associated outgrowths had a population of 3,552,371. 9.45% of the population was under 6 years of age. Vadodara had a sex ratio of 920 females per 1000 males and a literacy rate of 90.48%. Scheduled Castes and Scheduled Tribes made up 6.63% and 4.07% of the population respectively.

Hinduism was the main religion, practiced by 85.39% of the population. Islam was the second-largest religion (11.40%). Jains were 1.52%, Christians 1.12% and Sikhs 0.45%.

At the time of the 2011 census, 71.37% of the population spoke Gujarati, 14.83% Hindi, 7.60% Marathi and 1.91% Sindhi as their first language.

Economy
In Vadodara various large-scale industries such as Gujarat Refinery of Indian Oil Corporation(IOCL), Gujarat State Fertilizers & Chemicals (GSFC), Vadodara Manufacturing Division(VMD)(Formerly IPCL) of Reliance Industries Limited, Deepak Nitrite, Parikh Industries, Linde Engineering India and Gujarat Alkalies and Chemicals Limited (GACL) have come up in the vicinity of Gujarat Refinery. Other large-scale public sector units are Heavy Water Project, Gujarat Industries Power Company Limited (GIPCL), Oil and Natural Gas Corporation (ONGC) & Gas Authority of India Limited (GAIL). Vadodara, is also manufacturing hub of power equipments, rail coaches , defense aircraft & several IT Sector Companies exists in Vadodara which are rapidly growing. Vadodara is also a hub of pharmaceutical industries,many pharmaceutical companies are located within and nearby Vadodara city,Vadodara is home to many big pharmaceutical companies too. Vadodara is major hub of pharmaceutical industries in Gujarat.

Located in Vadodara are over 35% of India's power transmission and distribution equipment manufacturers and an estimated 800 ancillaries supporting the big players in Power Sector equipment manufacturing and engineering industry. Larsen & Tourbo(L&T), has established “Knowledge City” in Vodadara. The L&T Knowledge City is the hub of several key businesses of the L&T Group. The Power business, Mid & Downstream Hydrocarbon, L&T Technology Services and the engineering joint venture L&T-Sargent & Lundy operate out of the facility. It also houses manufacturing facility for switchgears, air circuit breakers (ACBs) and moulded case circuit breakers (MCCBs).

Bombardier Transportation, a Canadian company, has established rail coach manufacturing plant in Savli along with other manufacturing companies such as Alstom, Siemens and Voltas. This plant manufactures coaches for Delhi Metro and the New Generation Rollingstock for Brisbane, Australia. The plant is also manufacturing trainsets for Delhi - Meerut RRTS. Beside this Vadodara holds a key position in pharmaceutical industry of Gujarat,as many small and big pharma companies are located in Vadodara.Vadodara is an strong economic pillar of Gujarat and India.

Tata Advanced Systems Limited(TASL), a subsidiary of Tata Group and Airbus joint-venture has set up C-295 transport aircraft manufacturing facility at Vadodara as part of a Rs 22,000 crore deal to supply 56 such aircraft. The C-295 will replace the Avro aircraft in service with the Indian Air Force. This project will make Vadodara, a defense manufacturing hub. The first Made in India aircraft is expected in September 2026.

The revenue for the city is generated through taxes, service provision, and state government assistance. The taxes include general taxes, conservancy taxes, water taxes whereas the non-tax or service can be water charges, rent from municipal properties, public service charges, etc. The VMC budget for the year 2020–2021 against the proposed budget of Rs 3,554 crore last year, stood at Rs 3,770 crore this year.

Government and politics

The Vadodara city's municipal corporation or Maha Nagar Palika is a part of the Vadodara district. The district is set up in three distinct levels of administration, which are the collectorate - the district falls under the jurisdiction of a collector; the prant offices which take care of the affairs of taluka and other state government offices and the mamlatdar or taluka offices. The overall district administration has four departments: city survey, district supply office, district planning office, and district election office.

The City elects one member to the Lok Sabha (parliament) and five to the Gujarat Vidhan Sabha (Assembly). All of the five assembly seats of Vadodara were won by the BJP during the legislative elections in 2017. In the 2021 VMSS/VMC elections, the BJP won 69 seats, seven seats went to the Congress.

Election wards: 19
Seats (Corporators): 76
Population per ward: 87,826
Seats reserved for women: 38
Total voters (as on 1 January 2019): 1,638,300

Civic administration 

According to the 2011 census, the total Urban Agglomeration (UA) population of Vadodara is 35,17,191. This is governed by the Vadodara Municipal Corporation which was founded in 1951. It was initially called the Baroda Municipal Corporation but later changed to Vadodara Municipal Corporation after the city's name was changed in the year 1974. The Bombay Municipal Corporation Act of 1951 was setup as the main legislation for the administration and governance of the Vadodara Municipal Corporation.

The villages Sayajipura, Bapod, Kapurai, Khatamba, Tarsal Kalali, Gorva, Chhani and Vemali were added to the VMC boundaries in 2017 and the latest expansion notice has been given to the seven villages of Sevasi, Bhayli, Vemali, Bil, Karodiya, Undera and Vadadala in the year 2020.

City governance 

The Bombay Provincial Municipal Corporations Act, 1949 governs the Vadodara Municipal Corporation. The Gujarat Provincial Municipal Corporations Act of 1949 which is derived from the Bombay Act No. LIX of 1949 is another legislation which most municipal corporation, including Vadodara in Gujarat function under.

The highest body of power in the municipal corporation is the General Board, which is composed of elected members from each ward within the VMC. There are 19 wards under the VMC, each of which consists 4 seats of councilor which has a 50% reservation of seats for women. There are a total of 76 councilors elected for this VMC term where every councilor is appointed in various committees for a period of one year.

The VMC has twelve executive committees apart from the standing committee, which look after the specialized functions of VMC. These committees include public works committee, water work committee, drainage and sewerage committee, health committee, town planning committee, estate management committee, recreation and culture committee, electric committee, and legal committee. Each committee consists of 12 councilors each. The formulation of an additional ward committee is recommended by the Gujarat Provincial Municipal Corporation Act of 1949 for a city exceeding the population of three lakhs- which is above the current population of Vadodara.

Politics 

Three corporators are elected from each ward, who in turn elect a mayor. Executive powers are vested in the municipal commissioner, who is an IAS officer appointed by the Gujarat state government. The mayor is responsible for the day-to-day running of the city services, municipal school board, the city bus service, the municipal hospital and the city library. The last municipal corporation election for Vadodara took place in the year 2015 where Bhartiya Janta Party won in the majority with 57 out of the total 76 seats, followed by the Indian National Congress (INC) with 14 seats.

There are six sitting MLAs who have VMC under their jurisdiction and are currently part of the state ministry. Rajendrabhai Trivedi is the BJP MLA and incumbent 14th Speaker of Gujarat Legislative Assembly, who was unanimously elected on 9 February 2018. Jitendra Sukhadia is the Minister of Tourism, Non-resident Gujarati division as well as the Food, Civil Supplies, and Consumer Affairs. Saurabhbhai Patel is the incumbent Energy Minister of Gujarat while Yogeshbhai Patel heads the Ministry of State for Narmada Development. The MLA Madhubhai Shrivastav is the state appointed Gujarat Agro Industries Corporation (GAIC) chief and Manisha Vakil is BJP's Vadodara City Assembly Constituency MLA.

Law and order 
The Vadodara City Police are responsible for law enforcement and public safety in Vadodara, Gujarat. The Vadodara City Police is headed by a Police Commissioner, an IPS officer. They are a subdivision of the state police force of Gujarat and are headed by a commissioner. The Vadodara police force is responsible for the protection and safety of Vadodara citizens. Shamsher Singh, a previous serving as the Additional Director General of Police (State Crime Record Bureau cum Computer Centre), Gandhinagar, is the current Police commissioner of the Vadodara. He formally took charge on 1 January 2021.

Civic services 

There are three civic service departments under the municipal corporation: the engineering department, the health department, and the support or administration department.

These departments together provide services, infrastructure and management for the entire city. The Engineering Department manages infrastructure and services provided through cells or sub-departments like bridge cell, drainage project, town development, streetlight, electrical sewerage, mechanical sewerage, building project, solid waste management, road, storm water drainage, water work, land and estate. The Health Department takes care of public health-related issues and services through its solid waste management, health and I.C.D.S. sub-departments. The health department also has a sub-department for managing Birth, Death & Marriage Registrations. The Support Department handles all IT and administration-related issues and services with cells like IT, accounts audit, census, P.R.O., election, land & estate (acquisition), shops & establishment, assessment, and U.C.D.-N.U.L.M departments.

Urban planning 
The two main institutions involved in planning and development in Vadodara are VMSS and the Vadodara Urban Development Authority (VUDA). The responsibilities of both these agencies are demarcated clearly not only physically but also functionally. The governing acts for both institutions differ.

Solid waste management 

The municipal corporation under its health department provides the solid waste management for the Vadodara city. All zonal asst. municipal commissioners, zonal health officers, ward officers, sanitary inspectors are part of the solid waste management committee who need to be present during the weekly SWM coordination meetings. The department takes care of the sweeping, cleaning and maintenance along with complaint redressal. All zonal chief, assistant municipal commissioners, zonal health officers and other sanitary staff are expected to work on field between 7am to 11am on weekdays. The solid waste management also has a litter prevention system which carries out litter patrol and charges fines as administrative fees from the defaulters.

Water supply 
An average of 53.2 million gallon (240 million litres) of water per day, or 38 gallon (190 litres) per person per day is provided the city daily to meets its daily water requirement. The water supply is provided by the water works department of the municipal corporation along with other agencies like the Sardar Sarovar Narmada limited who directly supply water to VMC which is looked after the Gujarat Pollution Control Board, the Gujarat Water Supply and Sewerage Board, and the Water and Sanitation Management Organization. The city receives its drinking water supply from 16 high rise water tanks and one busting station located within the city.

The Sardar Sarovar Dam which is the one of the drinking water source for city, had halted supply temporarily after receiving complains about the high sulphur content Narmada river, but was restarted again after a few days. The other sources of water are the Mahi River for which the water is obtained from French well which has naturally purified water through layers of sand. The Ajwa Sarovar is another source of drinking water, the water of which is filtered at Nimeta Water Purification Plant.

In January 2019, VUDA and GWSSB joined hands to reduce the acute shortage of drinking water for residential societies near close to the Vadodara city. A quantity of 3 MLD water per day for three years will be provided as a temporary measure until  water from the Timbi pond and Narmada canal reaches these residences.

Drainage and sewage 

The drainage is provided under the Engineering department's drainage projects or the Public Health Engineering Laboratory (PHEL). The department provides planning, designing, estimating, tendering, executing and operating and maintaining the sewerage systems like the sewerage network, sewage pumping stations, sewage pumping mains, sewage treatment and effluent disposal works.

Electricity 
Madhya Gujarat Vij Company Limited (MGVCL) is the main electricity provision company for the Gujarat state and Vadodara. Hydroelectricity is additionally being generated by water from Sardar Sarovar Dam with six units of river bed power houses of 200 megawatt each.

Fire and emergency 
Fire and rescue operations are provided by the VMC under its fire department which is provided according to the Section 285 to 289 of the BPMC Act. VMC has fixed rates for rescue operations & fire extinguishing within the VMC limits and outside it. The VMC's fire department also provide additional services like water tanker provision for domestic, religious or marriage purposes, providing ambulance, dead body carrier.

Transport
The city is on the major rail and road arteries joining Mumbai with Delhi and Mumbai with Ahmedabad.

Air
Vadodara Airport (IATA: BDQ) is located north-east of the city. Vadodara has flight connections with Mumbai, New Delhi,Hyderabad and Bangalore. Air India and IndiGo are currently operating their services from the airport. A new integrated international terminal has been constructed at the Vadodara airport and was inaugurated in October 2016. Vadodara is the first Green Airport in Gujarat and Second Green Airport in India after Kochi.

Railway

Vadodara was part of the historic Bombay, Baroda and Central India Railway (BBCI), which arrived in the city in January 1861. On 5 November 1951 the BBCI Railway was merged with the Saurashtra, Rajputana and Jaipur railways to create the Western Railway. Vadodara Railway Station now belongs to the Western Railway zone of Indian Railways and is a major junction on the Western Railway Main Line.

The under-construction Mumbai–Ahmedabad high-speed rail corridor, India's first High-speed rail line will have a stop at the existing Vadodara Junction railway station. The station is planned for renovation to accommodate the new line.

Bus

Vadodara bus station is also beautifully designed as a symbol of Banyan (Vad) trees and located near by Railway Station. It also has a market, food court and multiplex facilities.

Religions and festivals
The most followed religion in the city is Hinduism, practiced by 85% of the population. The second most followed religion is Islam, followed by 11% of the population. All other religious groups make up the remaining 4% of the population. This city has also had an old history of religion.

Sports
Vadodara has a professional cricket team, the Baroda cricket team, as well as the oldest cricket ground in Asia, called Moti Baug. The team has won the Ranji Trophy six times. Reliance Stadium, a private cricket ground owned by Reliance Industries, hosts ODIs. Some of the notable cricketer's from Baroda are Vijay Hazare,Anshuman Gaekwad,Kiran More, Nayan Mongia, Atul Bedade, Irfan Pathan, Yusuf Pathan, Hardik Pandya, Krunal Pandya, Deepak Hooda.

Vadodara too have an International cricket stadium under construction at Kotambi.Vadodara would also have a sports university in Desar.

Media
The city has five local FM stations: Radio City (91.1 MHz), Radio Mirchi (98.3 MHz), Red FM (93.5 MHz), Big FM (92.7 MHz), and All India Radio, Vividh Bharti (93.9 MHz)(Aakashwani). Radio City (91.1 MHz) is known all over Vadodara for its Rag Rag Ma Vadodara City profile. All India Radio is broadcast on the AM band. Satellite radio was launched in nearby city of Ahmedabad by WorldSpace in 2005. Vadodara News Magazine(VNM) is a local news TV channel that covers events in the city. Sandesh News is a local news TV channel.

Education 

The city houses many Schools and Colleges, including Baroda High School. Higher Education Institutions across various disciplines attract international students mainly from the African countries such as Ethiopia, Zimbabwe, Malawi, South Africa, and Kenya.

Universities 
 The Maharaja Sayajirao University of Baroda
 Sigma Group of Institute
 Parul University
 Navrachna University
 GSFC University
 National Rail and Transportation Institute (Railway University) 
 Sumandeep Vidyapeeth
 ITM Vocational University

Secondary schools 
Navrachana Higher Secondary School
Navrachana Vidyani Vidyalaya
Navrachana International School

References

Further reading

External links

 
Metropolitan cities in India
Former capital cities in India